Taip Ramadani (born 1 January 1972) is an Australian handball coach, former Australian national team player and Sydney 2000 Olympian.

Biography
Handball Australia appointed Ramadani as the head coach of the national men’s program in September 2021, for a second term with the Australian men’s team. He previously led Australia between 2009 and 2013. A period that included the 2011 Handball World Championships in Sweden, and the 2013 Handball World Championships in Spain.

Between 2016 and 2021, Ramadani was the head coach of the Kosovo men’s national team. Ramadani led the team to Bronze medal at the 2017 IHF Trophy, and to their first international points in European Championship  and World Championship qualification tournaments.

As a player, Ramadani played with various Sydney clubs before transferring to Hungarian club Csömör KSK in 1998. In 2001, Ramadani joined Norwegian club Drammen HK and in 2005 he transferred to Qatar's Al Gharrafa club.
In 2006, Ramadani founded the Canberra Handball Club which, in its inaugural season, and in 2010, won the New South Wales League.

Ramadani played 64 international matches for Australia, scoring 167 goals, between 1993 and 2009.  He competed at the Sydney 2000 Olympic Games and four IHF World Championships: Egypt 1999, Portugal 2003, Tunisia 2005 and Croatia 2009. In 2009 he made a return to International Handball with four appearances for Australia at the Croatia 2009, where he was also the assistant coach of the team.

Ramadani was born in Sydney, Australia on 1 January 1972. He is of Albanian origin.

References

External links 
Australia men's national handball team
Kosovo men's national handball team

1972 births
Living people
Australian male handball players
Australian handball coaches
Handball players at the 2000 Summer Olympics
Olympic handball players of Australia
Australian people of Albanian descent
Sportspeople from Sydney
Expatriate handball players
Australian expatriate sportspeople in Norway
Australian expatriate sportspeople in Qatar
Australian expatriate sportspeople in Hungary
Australian expatriate sportspeople in Kosovo